Hans Olof Alsén (16 August 1926 – 1 February 2023) was a Swedish politician. A member of the Social Democratic Party, he served in the Riksdag from 1974 to 1982 and was Governor of Uppsala County from 1986 to 1992.

Alsén died in Uppsala Municipality on 1 February 2023, at the age of 96.

References

1926 births
2023 deaths
20th-century Swedish politicians
Members of the Riksdag 1974–1976
Members of the Riksdag 1976–1979
Members of the Riksdag 1979–1982
Governors of Uppsala County
Swedish Social Democratic Party politicians